The 1995–96 Midland Football Alliance season was the second in the history of Midland Football Alliance, a football competition in England.

Clubs and league table
The league featured 18 clubs from the previous season, along with two new clubs:
Armitage, relegated from the Southern Football League
Blakenall, promoted from the West Midlands (Regional) League

League table

References

External links
 Midland Football Alliance

1995–96
8